Marek Jiras (born 18 August 1976 in Prague) is a Czech slalom canoeist who competed at the international level from 1992 to 2009.

He won a bronze medal in the C2 event at the 2000 Summer Olympics together with Tomáš Máder. They then competed in the same event at the 2004 Summer Olympics, where they finished seventh.

Jiras and Máder also won eight medals at the ICF Canoe Slalom World Championships with six golds (C2: 1999, C2 team: 1993, 1999, 2003, 2006, 2007), a silver (C2 team: 1997) and a bronze (C2: 2002). They won five more medals at the European Championships (1 gold, 3 silvers and 1 bronze).

World Cup individual podiums

1 European Championship counting for World Cup points

References

DatabaseOlympics.com profile

1976 births
Czech male canoeists
Canoeists at the 2000 Summer Olympics
Canoeists at the 2004 Summer Olympics
Living people
Olympic canoeists of the Czech Republic
Olympic bronze medalists for the Czech Republic
Olympic medalists in canoeing
Medalists at the 2000 Summer Olympics
Medalists at the ICF Canoe Slalom World Championships
Canoeists from Prague